UDP  may refer to:

Political parties
 Ulster Democratic Party, in Northern Ireland
 União Democrática Popular (People's Democratic Union (Portugal))
 Unidad Democrática y Popular (Democratic and Popular Union), a former Bolivian umbrella party
 United Democratic Party (disambiguation), multiple organisations

Science and technology
 Undecaprenyl phosphate, a bacterial cell membrane carrier lipid
 Uridine diphosphate, an organic chemical
 User Datagram Protocol, a network communications method
 Usenet Death Penalty, a discussion group disciplinary response
 Universality-diversity paradigm

Other uses
 Unit Deployment Program, a military assignment system
 Unitary development plan, a land use planning system
 Universidad Diego Portales (Diego Portales University), in Chile